Sanogoszcz  is a village in the administrative district of Gmina Cielądz, within Rawa County, Łódź Voivodeship, in central Poland.

The village has an approximate population of 170.

References

Sanogoszcz